Eugen Petrache (born 13 July 1945) is a Romanian rower. He competed in the men's single sculls event at the 1968 Summer Olympics.

References

1945 births
Living people
Romanian male rowers
Olympic rowers of Romania
Rowers at the 1968 Summer Olympics
Sportspeople from Bucharest